Birkir Valur Jónsson (born 2 November 1998) is an Icelandic footballer who plays for HK as a right back.

Club career
Jónsson made his debut for HK in a 3–2 win against KA on 27 June 2015. On 28 July 2020, he joined Spartak Trnava on loan from HK. He returned to HK in January 2021.

References

External links
 

1998 births
Living people
Birkir Valur Jonsson
Birkir Valur Jonsson
Birkir Valur Jonsson
Birkir Valur Jonsson
Association football defenders
Birkir Valur Jonsson
1. deild karla players
Birkir Valur Jonsson
FC Spartak Trnava players
Slovak Super Liga players
Expatriate footballers in Slovakia
Birkir Valur Jonsson